"Take My Breath Away" is a song by Swedish DJ and record producer Alesso, co-produced with Dillon Francis and featuring uncredited vocals by Diana Gordon. It was released on 21 October 2016.

Composition
The song around a well-suited blend of sultry vocals, melodic synths, pounding percussions, and frenetic builds.

Lyric video
The lyric video was uploaded on 2 November 2016, that takes listeners on a journey through stunning visuals.

Charts

Weekly charts

Year-end charts

References

2016 singles
2016 songs
Alesso songs
Song recordings produced by Alesso